Gary Aramist (גדי ארמיסט; born July 24, 1958) is an Israeli former Olympic sport shooter.

He is Jewish.

Shooting career
Aramist competed for Israel at the 1984 Summer Olympics in Los Angeles, California, at the age of 26 in sport shooting.  In Men's Free Pistol, 50 metres, he came in tied for 36th out of 56 competitors. When he competed in the Olympics, he was 5-5.5 (167 cm) tall and weighed 139 lbs (63 kg).

References 

Israeli male sport shooters
Olympic shooters of Israel
1958 births
Jewish sport shooters
Living people
Shooters at the 1984 Summer Olympics